Mount Frosch is a mainly snow-covered mountain,  high, standing  northeast of Mount Riddolls at the head of Borchgrevink Glacier, in the Victory Mountains of Victoria Land, Antarctica. It was mapped by the United States Geological Survey from surveys and U.S. Navy aerial photographs in 1960–62, and named by the Advisory Committee on Antarctic Names for Robert A. Frosch, Assistant Secretary of the Navy for Research and Development, 1971–72, and Administrator, National Aeronautics and Space Administration 1978.

References

Mountains of Victoria Land
Borchgrevink Coast
Two-thousanders of Antarctica